Luis Adrián Morejón (born 28 March 1973) is a former tennis player from Ecuador who turned professional in 1991. He represented his native country at the 1996 Summer Olympics in Atlanta, Georgia, where he was defeated in the first round by Uruguay's Marcelo Filippini. The right-hander reached his highest singles ATP ranking on 24 June 1996, when he became the number 122 in the world.

External links
 
 
 

1973 births
Living people
Ecuadorian male tennis players
Olympic tennis players of Ecuador
Sportspeople from Guayaquil
Tennis players at the 1996 Summer Olympics
People from Aventura, Florida
South American Games medalists in tennis
South American Games silver medalists for Ecuador
Competitors at the 1994 South American Games
Tennis players at the 2003 Pan American Games
Pan American Games competitors for Ecuador